Teagan Jade Micah (born 20 October 1997) is an Australian international soccer player who plays as a goalkeeper for the Australia women's national soccer team and FC Rosengård in Sweden's Damallsvenskan.

In May 2019, Micah was named to the 23-player squad that will represent Australia at the 2019 FIFA Women's World Cup.

Early life
Micah was born and raised in the Gippsland town of Moe in regional Victoria, where she played in the junior system at local soccer club Moe United for three seasons. At the age of 10, she moved to Redcliffe, Queensland, where she attended Redcliffe State High School. She trained with the Goalkeeping Australia Academy from the age of thirteen, in addition to playing for the Queensland Academy of Sport.

College career
In 2016, Micah received a full soccer scholarship to the University of California, Los Angeles. In her freshman season at UCLA, Micah played every minute of every game and became the first freshman goalkeeper to start UCLA's opening match since 2004. Micah earned nine shutouts over the course of the season and was named Pac-12 Goalkeeper of the Week three times. In her sophomore season at UCLA, Micah played in all of UCLA's 25 games, including the College Cup final.

Club career

Brisbane Roar. 2013–15
Micah signed with the W-League's Brisbane Roar FC, aged 16.  During her two years at the club she served as a back-up keeper.

Western Sydney Wanderers, 2015–16
She moved to the Western Sydney Wanderers FCfor the 2015–16 W-League season. She made her W-League debut aged 18 and went on to appear 5 times for the Wanderes.

Melbourne Victory, 2019–20
Following her UCLA career Micah returned to the W-League for the 2019–20 season.  She served as a backup keeper to fellow Matildas keeper Casey Dumont.

Norway, 2020–21
Micah signed with Norwegian Toppserien side Arna-Bjørnar ahead of the 2020 season.

In November 2020, Micah returned to Australia for the European winter break, signing with Melbourne City. She returned to Norway and Arna-Bjørnar's rivals from Bergen, IL Sandviken, in May 2021.

Rosengård, 2021–
In August 2021, only a few months after joining IL Sandviken and following her playing at the 2020 Summer Olympics, Micah joined Swedish club Rosengård on a two-year contract.

International career
After stints with Australia's U-17 and U-20 national teams, Micah earned her first senior national team call-up for the 2017 Tournament of Nations. She was again named to the national team roster for a friendly against the United States in April 2019. The following month, Teagan was announced as a member of Australia's squad for the 2019 FIFA Women's World Cup. As of May 2019, she has yet to make an appearance in goal for the senior national team.

Micah was a member of the Matildas Tokyo 2020 Olympics squad. The Matildas qualified for the quarter-finals and beat Great Britain before being eliminated in the semi-final with Sweden. In the playoff for the Bronze medal they were beaten by the USA.

Career statistics

Club 

1Norwegian Cup.

References

1997 births
Living people
Australian women's soccer players
Brisbane Roar FC (A-League Women) players
Western Sydney Wanderers FC (A-League Women) players
UCLA Bruins women's soccer players
Melbourne Victory FC (A-League Women) players
Arna-Bjørnar players
Toppserien players
Melbourne City FC (A-League Women) players
SK Brann Kvinner players
FC Rosengård players
Women's association football goalkeepers
2019 FIFA Women's World Cup players
Australian expatriate women's soccer players
Expatriate women's footballers in Norway
Australian expatriate sportspeople in Norway
Footballers at the 2020 Summer Olympics
Olympic soccer players of Australia
Australia women's international soccer players
Australian expatriate sportspeople in Sweden
Expatriate women's footballers in Sweden